Bluff Creek is a stream in the U.S. state of Iowa. It is a tributary to the Des Moines River.

Bluff Creek was named for the steep bluffs along its course.

References

Rivers of Iowa
Rivers of Boone County, Iowa
Rivers of Webster County, Iowa